Marcus Ehning (born 19 April 1974 in Südlohn, North Rhine-Westphalia) is a German show jumping champion, Olympic champion from 2000. He is married to Nadia Ehning (née Zülow). He won the Longines Global Champions Tour of Vienna Grand Prix on Plot Blue in September 2014.

Horses 
Marcus Ehning joined the equestrian world when he was 7 years old. His firsts horses, which let him learn and take confidence in low and medium level shows, were Lord, Metal, Starlight, Queen and Bright Ruby. Then he started obtaining great results in higher level competitions mostly thanks to Orchidee, Opium and Talan. He reached the top level with For Pleasure and from that point he constantly grew with his horses, achieving victories in competitions worldwide. His top horses are Plot Blue, Cornado, Comme Il Faut, Singular LS La Silla, Gaudi and Sabrina. Beyond high level competitions, he also takes care of his young horses, training them day by day.

Olympic Record
Ehning participated at the 2000 Summer Olympics in Sydney, where he won a gold medal in Team Jumping, together with Lars Nieberg, Otto Becker and Ludger Beerbaum.

International Championship Results

References

External links

Official website

1974 births
Living people
People from Borken (district)
Sportspeople from Münster (region)
Equestrians at the 2000 Summer Olympics
Equestrians at the 2012 Summer Olympics
Olympic equestrians of Germany
Olympic gold medalists for Germany
German male equestrians
German show jumping riders
Olympic medalists in equestrian
Medalists at the 2000 Summer Olympics